Sund is a village in the municipality of Hemnes in Nordland county, Norway.  It is located just south of the village of Hemnesberget on the Hemnes peninsula.

References

Hemnes
Villages in Nordland